Pacific Shipping, Inc. (PSI) is a shipping company founded in 2009 and incorporated in Majuro, Marshall Islands in 2012. PSI is the Shipping agent for Pacific International Lines, Mariana Express Lines PTE LTD, Pacific Direct Line LTD & Inchcape Shipping Services. PSI is the only agency that handle all oil tankers transport on Majuro (2012 - 2020). The founders of PSI are the Marshallese entrepreneur, honorary consulate of Israel in Majuro, former Minister of Works, Infrastructure, and Utilities, Minister of Foreign affairs during the term of late president Amata Kabua and Senator of Marshall Islands Charles T. Domnick together with Damian Reimers for operations manager, Hackney Takju as General manager & Francis Carlos Domnick as CEO (Including Anil Development Inc.). PSI is the sister companies of Anil Development Inc. and DAR Sales & Services.

Description
The company is started in 2009 as DAR Shipping Agency, Since 2012 as the company expanded and launched its Containerization program it became the Shipping agent for Mariana Express Lines LTD. (MELL) based in Singapore, Pacific International Lines (partially the ownership of Singapore's Mariana Express Lines) and Pacific Direct Line based in New Zealand, Also providing services for Inchcape Shipping Services (ISS) oil tankers in Majuro. In 2018 CTSI ( Consolidated Transportation Services Incorporated ) Air & Sea Services Logistics based on Guam make a deal on PSI to be their agent in Majuro. PSI also accommodate Cruise ships having leisure in Marshall Islands and private or public (government) projects/services.

PSI offer liner shipping services to route of Hong Kong, Guam, Saipan, Taiwan and United States ports for PIL. Using Hong Kong and Kaoshiung as hubs, MELL currently carries containers between China, Southeast Asia, Japan, Australia and islands in the Pacific with 22 ports including Fiji (Suva and Lautoka), Samoa, American Samoa, Tonga (Nuku’alofa), Tahiti, the Cook Islands (Rarotonga), Norfolk & Tarawa for PDL.

In August 2016 when Indian Navy visited Majuro for commitment to peace and prosperity of the Indo-Pacific region and Indian Navy's increasing footprint and operational reach, Pacific Shipping, Inc. serve for providing the navy transportation services in Majuro.

In March 2019 while Pacific Partnership wraps up in Marshall Islands, Pacific Shipping, Inc. working with Seaway Filipinas Logistics based on Olongapo, Zambales Philippines to provide all transportation services to US Navy (USNS Brunswick) that joins the program.

Board of Directors
 Salome Domnick-Andrike (President)
 Charles T. Domnick (Chairman)
 Francis Carlos Domnick (CEO)
 Mio Domnick-Takju (CFO)
 Miriam Domnick (non-executive director)
 Jauwe Domnick-Kabua (non-executive director)
 Charles L. Domnick, Jr. (non-executive director)

Executive Management/Departments
 Salome Domnick-Andrike (CEO)
 Francis Carlos Domnick (President)
 Mio Domnick-Takju (CFO)
 Jeffrey Riofrer (COO)
 Aloysius Domnick (Deputy Operations Manager)

Vessels

MELL Cargo vessels to Majuro & Ebeye
 MV KOTA HENNING
 MV KOTA HAPAS
 MV KOTA HAKIM
 MV KOTA HARUM
 MV KOTA HALUS

PDL Cargo vessels to Majuro
 MV SOUTHERN PEARL
 MV CAPITAINE QUIROS

DAR Cargo/Fishing vessels in Majuro to Ebeye
 LC CHASE D
 MV JEJNICA
 MV Charlies Angels (decommissioned)
 MV Tojolok (decommissioned)
 MV Miss Tamioko (decommissioned)

Oil Tanker vessels to Majuro
 MT AKRI
 MT SOPHIA
 STI MANHATTAN
 STI ASTRALL EXPRESS
 STI CSC PEACE
 STI AQUA
 STI FOREVER GLORY
 MV FAIRLIFT
 STI FOREVER PROSPERITY
 STI GRAND ACE
 STI MAYFAIR
 MT AXIOS
 MT HIGH VENTURE
 MT LEOPARD STAR
 MT CHANG HANG XI WANG
 MT HERACLES

See also
Pacific International Lines
Marshall Islands
Containerization
Flag of convenience
Tanker (ship)

References

External links
Official website

2009 establishments in Oceania
Shipping companies of Oceania